Koshkosh (also known as Gūsh Gūsh, Khushkushan, Kos̄kosh, and Kūsh Kūsh) is a village in Khorgam Rural District, Khorgam District, Rudbar County, Gilan Province, Iran. At the 2006 census, its population was 25, in 12 families.

References 

Populated places in Rudbar County